The publications of the Institute of Electrical and Electronics Engineers (IEEE) constitute around 30% of the world literature in the electrical and electronics engineering and computer science fields, publishing well over 100 peer-reviewed journals. The content in these journals as well as the content from several hundred annual conferences are available in the IEEE's online digital library. The IEEE also publishes more than 750 conference proceedings every year. In addition, the IEEE Standards Association maintains over 1,300 standards  in engineering.

Some of the journals are published in association with other societies, like the Association for Computing Machinery (ACM), the American Society of Mechanical Engineers (ASME), the Optical Society (OSA), and the Minerals, Metals & Materials Society (TMS).

Journals

Magazines

Other
 Communications and Networks, Journal of, by the Korean Institute of Communications Sciences (KICS) and technically cosponsored by the IEEE Communications Society

See also
 :Category:IEEE conferences, many with published proceedings.

References 

IEEE